Sea surface kinematics multiscale monitoring (SKIM) was one of the two candidate missions for the 9th Earth Explorer mission of in the Living Planet Programme of the European Space Agency (ESA).  SKIM and the other candidate (FORUM) were pre-selected for a detailed study in November 2017. Only one of the two candidates was to be selected in 2019 for immediate implementation and a possible launch by the year 2025, and FORUM was chosen.

Context 
SKIM builds on the technological heritage of the SWIM instrument now flying on the China-France Ocean Satellite, with the important addition of Doppler measurement and changing from Ku to Ka-band. SKIM also inherits experience with Ka-band altimetry from the Indian-France SARAL-AltiKa mission.

Scientific Objectives 
The mission's science goals are to 
determine how the dynamics of the ocean total surface current velocity influence the integrated Earth system
more specifically, 
Determine the transport by waves and currents of material at the ocean surface including plankton, nutrients, heat, carbon, oil, and marine plastic debris
Map and apply currents and its components to generate better estimates of atmosphere–ocean exchanges of heat, gas, momentum and energy accounting for the full interplay between the surface ocean and the lower atmosphere (including upper ocean mixing) 
The satellite will overfly Earth from 83°S to 83°N, covering at least 97 percent of the globe.

References

External links 
SKIM hosted by LOPS

Earth satellite radar altimeters
Cosmic Vision
European Space Agency satellites
Cancelled spacecraft